Walter Kingsley Irwin (September 23, 1897 – August 18, 1976) was a Major League Baseball player.

Irvin was born in Henrietta, Pennsylvania, and died in Spring Lake, Michigan.

External links

St. Louis Cardinals players
1897 births
1976 deaths
Baseball players from Pennsylvania
American military personnel of World War I